The England cricket team toured Zimbabwe from 1 October to 13 October 2001 for a five-match One Day International (ODI) series, with three matches in Harare and two in Bulawayo. England won all five matches.

Squads
On 28 August 2001, England named an initial 16-man squad for the tour, including three uncapped players: wicket-keeper James Foster, and bowlers James Kirtley and Jeremy Snape. Bowler James Ormond withdrew from the squad on 15 September after suffering from patellar tendinitis in his right knee, while all-rounder Craig White also pulled out after twisting his right knee in training; they were replaced by bowler Chris Silverwood and batsman Graham Thorpe, respectively.

† – withdrew from squad

Tour match

50-over: Zimbabwe A vs England XI

ODI series

1st ODI

2nd ODI

3rd ODI

4th ODI

5th ODI

References

External links
Zimbabwe vs England at Cricinfo

2001 in English cricket
2001 in Zimbabwean cricket
2001-02
England 2001-02
International cricket competitions in 2001–02